Alashan (PRC romanization: Alxa) may refer to:

Helan Mountains, a mountain range in northern China, between Ningxia and Inner Mongolia's Alxa League
Alxa League, a prefecture-level division of Inner Mongolia
Alashan, Kyrgyzstan, a town in Kyrgyzstan